Eretis is a genus of skippers in the family Hesperiidae.

Species
Eretis buamba Evans, 1937
Eretis camerona Evans, 1937
Eretis djaelaelae (Wallengren, 1857)
Eretis herewardi Riley, 1921
Eretis lugens (Rogenhofer, 1891)
Eretis melania Mabille, 1891
Eretis mitiana Evans, 1937
Eretis mixta Evans, 1937
Eretis plistonicus (Plötz, 1879)
Eretis umbra (Trimen, 1862)
Eretis vaga Evans, 1937

References
Natural History Museum Lepidoptera genus database

External links
Eretis at funet
Seitz, A. Die Gross-Schmetterlinge der Erde 13: Die Afrikanischen Tagfalter. Plate XIII 76

Celaenorrhinini
Hesperiidae genera
Taxa named by Paul Mabille